We Beheld the Last Contraction of the Seraph is an EP by Abu Lahab, independently released on February 5, 2012.

Track listing

Personnel
Adapted from the We Beheld the Last Contraction of the Seraph liner notes.
 Abu Lahab – vocals, instruments, cover art

References

External links 
 We Beheld the Last Contraction of the Seraph at Discogs (list of releases)
 We Beheld the Last Contraction of the Seraph on YouTube

2012 EPs
Abu Lahab (musical project) albums